Miloje Todorović (1762 – 1832), was a Serbian voivode and politician.

Biography
Todorović participated in Koča's frontier rebellion and both the First Serbian Uprising and the Second Serbian Uprising. Due to great contributions he made in the First Serbian Uprising Karađorđe declared him a voivode. As a fluent speaker of Turkish and one of Serbia's most notable people. He was a part of Serbian delegation which came up with a peace treaty with the Ottoman Empire in 1815. For that achievement, sultan Mahmud II bestowed Todorović with silver sabre and other gifts. After the end of Serbian Revolution, Todorović held a number of public offices in the area of Civil law courts.

See also
 List of Serbian Revolutionaries

References

People of the First Serbian Uprising
Prime Ministers of Serbia
19th-century Serbian people
Politicians from Jagodina
1762 births
1832 deaths